Drangiana or Zarangiana (Drangianē;  also attested in Old Western Iranian as 𐏀𐎼𐎣, Zraka or Zranka, was a historical region and administrative division of the Achaemenid Empire. This region comprises territory around Hamun Lake, wetlands in endorheic Sistan Basin on the Iran-Afghan border, and its primary watershed Helmand river in what is nowadays southwestern region of Afghanistan.

History
In ancient times Drangiana was inhabited by an Iranian tribe which the ancient Greeks called Sarangians or Drangians. Drangiana was possibly subdued by another Iranian people, the Medes, and later, certainly, by the expanding Persian Achaemenid Empire of Cyrus the Great (559-530 BC). According to Herodotus, during the reign of Darius I (522-486 BC), the Drangians were placed in the same district as the Utians, Thamanaeans, Mycians, and those deported to the Persian Gulf. The capital of Drangiana, called Zarin or Zranka (like the Province), is identified with great probability with the extensive Achaemenid site of Dahan-e Gholaman southeast of Zabol in Iran.  Another significant center was the city of Prophthasia, possibly located at modern Farah in Afghanistan.  On occasion Drangiana was governed by the same satrap as neighboring Arachosia.  In 330-329 BC, the region was conquered by Alexander the Great. Drangiana continued to constitute an administrative district under Alexander and his successors.  At Alexander's death in 323 BC, it was governed by Stasanor of Soloi, and later, in 321 BC, it was allotted to another Cypriot, Stasandros.  By the end of the 4th century BC, Drangiana was part of the Seleucid Empire, but in the second half of the 3rd century BC it was at least temporarily annexed by Euthydemos I of Bactria.  In 206-205 BC Antiochos III (222-187 BC) seems to have recovered Drangiana for the Seleucids during his Anabasis. The history of Drangiana during the weakening of Seleucid rule is unclear, but by the mid-2nd century BC the area was conquered by the expanding Parthian Empire of the Arsacids.

Notes

References

 
 G. Gnoli, "Dahan-e Ḡolāmān," Encyclopaedia Iranica, vol. 6 (1993) 582-585.
 Drangiana by Jona Lendering 
 R. Schmitt, "Drangiana," Encyclopaedia Iranica, vol. 7 (1995) 534-537.

Achaemenid satrapies
Historical Iranian peoples
History of Zoroastrianism
Nomadic groups in Eurasia
Ancient Greek geography
Geographic history of Afghanistan